New York F.C. may refer to:
New York Field Club (founded 1916), two early 20th-century American soccer clubs
New York City Football Club (founded 2013), an American soccer club
F.C. New York (2011–2012), an American soccer club

See also
Brooklyn F.C. (New York), an American soccer club based in Brooklyn, New York